The Oklahoma Sooners football program is a college football team that represents the University of Oklahoma. The team has had 23 head coaches since organized football began in 1895. The Sooners have played in more than 1,200 games in its 121 seasons. In those seasons, nine coaches have led the Sooners to postseason bowl games: Thomas E. Stidham, Jim Tatum, Bud Wilkinson, Gomer Jones, Chuck Fairbanks, Barry Switzer, Gary Gibbs, Bob Stoops and Lincoln Riley. Nine coaches have won conference championships with the Sooners: Bennie Owen, Stidham, Dewey Luster, Tatum, Wilkinson, Fairbanks, Switzer, Stoops and Riley. Wilkinson, Switzer and Stoops have also won national championships with the Sooners. Stoops is the all-time leader in games coached and won, Owen is the all-time leader in years coached, while Riley is the all-time leader in winning percentage. John Harts is, in terms of winning percentage, the worst coach the Sooners have had as he lost the only game he coached. John Blake has the lowest winning percentage of those who have coached more than one game with .353 in his 34 games.

Of the 23 Sooner coaches, Owen, Lawrence Jones, Tatum, Wilkinson, Switzer and Stoops have been inducted into the College Football Hall of Fame. Wilkinson, Switzer, and Stoops have each received National Coach of the Year honors from at least one organization. The current head coach is Brent Venables, who was hired on December 5, 2021, replacing  Lincoln Riley after his departure to become the head coach at the University of Southern California (USC) in November 2021.

Key

Coaches
Statistics correct as of the end of the 2022 NCAA Division I FBS football season

Notes

References
General

Specific

Lists of college football head coaches

Oklahoma Sooners football coaches